Alick Bevan (27 March 1915 – 24 January 1945) was a British cyclist. He competed in the individual and team road race events at the 1936 Summer Olympics. 

He was son of Percy and Rose Anne Bevan of Battersea, London.

He was killed in action during World War II while serving in the Western Allied invasion of Germany. He was serving as a lieutenant in the East Surrey Regiment who was attached to the 7th Battalion of the Hampshire Regiment when he was mortally wounded by a landmine while participating in an operation around the towns of Pütt and Walderath in Heinsberg, western Nazi Germany. He was buried in Brunssum War Cemetery in the Netherlands.

References

External links
 

1915 births
1945 deaths
British male cyclists
Olympic cyclists of Great Britain
Cyclists at the 1936 Summer Olympics
People from Wandsworth
Cyclists from Greater London
British Army personnel killed in World War II
East Surrey Regiment officers
Military personnel from London
Landmine victims